The 2011 Open 13 was a men's tennis tournament played on indoor hard courts. It was the 18th edition of the Open 13, and was part of the ATP World Tour 250 tier of the 2011 ATP World Tour. It took place at the Palais des Sports in Marseille, France, from 14 February through 20 February 2010. First-seeded Robin Söderling won the singles title.

Entrants

Seeds

1 Rankings are as of February 7, 2011.

Other entrants 
The following players received wildcards into the main draw:
  Grigor Dimitrov
  Nicolas Mahut
  Benoît Paire

The following players received entry from the qualifying draw:
  Stéphane Bohli
  Andrey Kumantsov
  Édouard Roger-Vasselin
  Thomas Schoorel

Finals

Singles

 Robin Söderling defeated  Marin Čilić, 6–7(8–10), 6–3, 6–3
It was Soderling's 3rd title of the year and 9th of his career.

Doubles

 Robin Haase /  Ken Skupski defeated  Julien Benneteau /  Jo-Wilfried Tsonga, 6–4, 6–7(4), [13-11]

References

External links
 Official website
 ITF tournament edition details

Open 13
Open 13